Delfin is the second EP by the Serbian rock band Smak, released in 2012.

Track listing

Personnel 
 Dejan Najdanović "Najda" – vocals
 Radomir Mihailović "Točak" – guitar
 Mikica Milosavljević – guitar
 Милош Петровић  – bass
 Slobodan Stojanović "Kepa"
 Dejan Stojanović Kepa Jr. – drums

References 
 Delfin at One Records official site

Smak albums
2012 EPs